Thomas Sykes may refer to:
Thomas Sykes (academic) (died 1705), English academic
Thomas Sykes (Mississippi politician) (fl. 1870s), American politician in Mississippi
Thomas A. Sykes (c. 1835–?), American politician in North Carolina and Tennessee
Thomas Hardcastle Sykes, English bleacher and businessman